George Washington (August 15, 1817 – August 26, 1905) was the founder of the town of Centralia, Washington. He is remembered as a leading African American pioneer of the Pacific Northwest.

Born within 10 miles of Winchester, Virginia, the son of a former slave and a woman of English descent, Washington was raised by a white couple named Anna and James Cochran. When he was four, the Cochrans moved west to Delaware County, Ohio. This region contained several stops on the underground railroad. They later left for Missouri. Washington became a skilled rifleman and taught himself to read.  He was given full rights as a citizen, except the right to vote, after the Cochrans petitioned the state of Missouri.

Fearing he might lose his freedom after the passage of the Compromise of 1850, Washington moved the Cochrans and himself over the Oregon Trail. Arriving in the Oregon Territory, they found he could not establish a claim for any land due to the exclusion laws passed by the Oregon Territorial Legislature in 1849. Upon arrival, because of these exclusion laws, Washington and his family were forced to settle nearby in Milwaukie. Washington started working as a logger, cutting timber for $90 a month plus board.

About three months after his arrival in Milwaukie, Washington became very ill. The ailment was unknown but he was in serious condition. The closest hospital at this time in pioneer country was the Columbia Barracks military fort (later Fort Vancouver) on the north side of the Columbia River. When the Cochrans took him there for treatment, they were told it was just for soldiers, though when the doctor came and saw Washington's condition he had a change of heart. He performed surgery on Washington, ultimately saving his life, but in the process poisoned him with calomel. The poison caused him to lose all of his hair permanently. In later pictures, he is shown wearing wigs. He recovered at the Columbia Barracks for 3–4 months. When he recovered, he and the Cochrans moved back to the Milwaukie area, where eventually Washington settled his parents into a cabin close to Cowlitz Landing.

Washington then left looking to settle his own land in the Olympia, Steilacoom, and Seattle regions of the territory. Although the law stood between Washington making a claim, he had the support of more than 100 pioneers who petitioned on his behalf to let him stay on the land of the Oregon Territory. Although the petition was heard in court, the amendment to let Blacks stay in the Oregon territory failed. Luckily for Washington, the petition to allow him to stay was barely passed with a 17–6 vote. However, on March 2, 1853, the Washington Territory which Washington eventually would make his claim in was made official and had no laws of exclusion.

Washington then left Oregon and settled near the confluence of the Chehalis and Skookumchuck Rivers, and the Cochrans claimed the land for the family in 1852. When the Washington Territory was split from the Oregon Territory in 1853, the new territory's statutes did not preclude African-Americans from owning land, and the Cochrans sold their land to him for $6,000. George cared for his adoptive parents for the rest of their lives, and later married the newly divorced Mary Jane Cain Cooness, helping raise her son, Stacey.

Anticipating the arrival of the Northern Pacific railroad in 1872, Washington had visions of a town on the southeast corner of his land. Saying that it was the center point between Kalama and Tacoma, he named his settlement the city of Centerville. He named the streets after biblical references and set aside land for a park (now the site of the Carnegie Library) and churches of many denominations. The town was incorporated as Centralia, Washington, in 1886 after it was discovered that another town in the territory already bore the name Centerville (although that town has since changed its name to Stanwood). This made Washington the only black person to found a town in the Pacific Northwest. Washington was the proponent of steady growth using fair business practices. Some said that he spoke in such an honest and straightforward way that buyers would become suspicious.

Despite facing some racial prejudice at the hands of newcomers, many of whom migrated from the segregated post-Civil War South, Washington supported many of the townspeople through the Panic of 1893, when the Northern Pacific went bankrupt and the town nearly collapsed. The town thrived in the boom started by the Klondike Gold Rush in 1898, and by the time he died in 1905 at the age of 88, Centralia had grown to a town of around 5,000 residents, who turned out en masse to honor him at his funeral. He is buried in the town's Washington Lawn Cemetery.

Centralia has a number of memorials to its founder, including a large stone monument telling his life story in the city's central plaza (a park donated by George and Mary Jane Washington, known as George Washington Park). During a year-long celebration of his 200th birthday, volunteers erected a bronze statue of George and Mary Jane Washington that was placed in George Washington Park in August 2018.

See also 
 George Washington Bush

References

External sources

 History Link
Centralia bibliography
Black Bios-Oregon trail
Chehalis, WA site
George Washington Bicentennial
"George Washington of Centralia," a 2018 biography

1817 births
1905 deaths
American city founders
People from Virginia
People from Centralia, Washington
People of pre-statehood Washington (state)
African-American history of Washington (state)
Washington (state) pioneers
African Americans in the American Old West